Mike Bradley (born September 16, 1978 in Haliburton, Ontario) is a former Canadian Football League running back for the Edmonton Eskimos.
He attended Haliburton Highlands Secondary School (HHSS). In Bradley's senior year, he ran a 10:84 in the 100m which remains the school's record to this day.
He is a graduate from the University of Waterloo, where he started in 1997.
He is now a Durham Regional Police Constable.

See also
 List of University of Waterloo people

External links
Just Sports Stats

Further reading 
 CFL statistics. Canadian Football League.
 
 
 
 

1978 births
Living people
Canadian football running backs
Edmonton Elks players
Waterloo Warriors football players